Shadow Weaver may refer to:
 Shadow Weaver, a character in the Princesses of Power franchise
 Shadow Weaver (The Legendary Pink Dots album), 1992 album
 Shadow Weaver (Choir album), 2014 album